Nocardiopsis quinghaiensis  is a Gram-positive and aerobic bacterium from the genus of Nocardiopsis which has been isolated from alkaline soil in Qaidam Basin in  China.

References

Further reading

External links
Type strain of Nocardiopsis quinghaiensis at BacDive -  the Bacterial Diversity Metadatabase	

Actinomycetales
Bacteria described in 2008